Axelsen is a surname. Notable people with the name include:

Geir Axelsen (born 1965), Norwegian economist, civil servant, and politician
Ole Christian Axelsen (1849–1917), Norwegian businessman
Viktor Axelsen (born 1994), Danish badminton player

See also
Axelson
Axelsson